Thomas R. Knutson is a climate modeller at the US Geophysical Fluid Dynamics Laboratory, a division of the National Oceanic and Atmospheric Administration (NOAA). His research covers hurricane activity, the link between climate change and hurricane incidence and intensity, and climate change detection and attribution.

Biography 
He served as a contributing author on working group 1 of the IPCC Fourth Assessment Report. He is an Associate Editor of the American Meteorological Society's Journal of Climate. He has published in Science, Proceedings of the National Academy of Sciences, Journal of Geophysical Research, Journal of Climate, Tropical Cyclone Research and Review, Tellus A and the Bulletin of the American Meteorological Society.

In 2004, Knutson published a paper suggesting that increases in atmospheric carbon dioxide would lead to more intense hurricanes. This finding was subsequently supported by independent research. Knutson was invited to discuss his thesis on Ron Reagan's MSNBC talk show, but the invitation was withdrawn after the White House intervened.

Selected works

References

External links 
GFDL home page
 biographical sketch 
 Donaghy, T., et al. (2007) "Atmosphere of Pressure" a report of the Government Accountability Project (Cambridge, Mass.: UCS Publications), page 30

Living people
Year of birth missing (living people)
National Oceanic and Atmospheric Administration personnel
American climatologists
Intergovernmental Panel on Climate Change contributing authors